The 2020–21 Aston Villa Football Club season was the club's 26th season in the Premier League and their 107th season at the top flight of English football. It is also the club's 146th season in existence. In addition to the domestic league, Aston Villa participated in the EFL Cup, being eliminated by Stoke City in the fourth round, and participated in the FA Cup, being eliminated by Liverpool in the third round.

Players

Current squad

|}

Transfers

Transfers in

Transfers out

Loans in

Loans out

Pre-season friendlies

On 25 August 2020, it was revealed that Aston Villa's first pre-season friendly would be against Bristol City. However, the location, kick off time and score would not be publicised until the match was finished.

Competitions

Overview

Premier League

League table

Results summary

Results by matchday

Matches
The 2020–21 season fixtures were released on 20 August.

FA Cup

Aston Villa joined the FA Cup along with all other Premier League teams in the third round. The third round draw was made on 30 November 2020, by Robbie Savage on the BT Sport YouTube channel. In the week building up to their third round tie against Liverpool, there was a "significant" COVID-19 outbreak at Villa's Bodymoor Heath Training Ground. Because of this, the entire Aston Villa first team was forced to self-isolate, as well as Dean Smith and his backroom staff. On the morning of 8 January 2021, Aston Villa confirmed that they would be forced to field a team made up of players from the Under-18s and Under-23s squads, managed by Mark Delaney.

EFL Cup

Aston Villa joined the EFL Cup in the second round. The second and third round draws were made on 6 September 2020, by Phil Babb on Sky Sports. The fourth round draw was made on 17 September 2020, also on Sky Sports.

Squad statistics

Appearances and goals

|-
! colspan=14 style=background:#dcdcdc; text-align:center| Goalkeepers

|-
! colspan=14 style=background:#dcdcdc; text-align:center| Defenders

|-
! colspan=14 style=background:#dcdcdc; text-align:center| Midfielders

     

|-
! colspan=14 style=background:#dcdcdc; text-align:center| Forwards

|-
! colspan=14 style=background:#dcdcdc; text-align:center| Players transferred or loaned out during the season

 

|-

Based on matches played until 23 May 2021 

Based on matches played until 23 May 2021

Notes

References

External links

Aston Villa F.C. seasons
Aston Villa